A sculptor is an artist who specializes in sculpture.

Sculptor may also refer to:

In astronomy
Sculptor (constellation), a constellation in the southern sky.  Several astronomical features located within the constellation share its name.
The Sculptor Group of galaxies, including:
Sculptor Galaxy, a spiral galaxy.
Sculptor Dwarf Irregular Galaxy.
Sculptor Dwarf Galaxy, a dwarf spheroidal galaxy and satellite galaxy of the Milky Way, not part of the Sculptor Group.
The Sculptor Wall, a supercluster of more distant galaxies.

Other uses
The Sculptor Squirrel, a species of Malaysian rodent.
 The Sculptor, a graphic novel by American cartoonist Scott McCloud
The USS Sculptor (AK-103), a cargo ship formerly part of the United States Navy